Hours for Jerome (1980–82) is an American silent experimental film in two parts directed by Nathaniel Dorsky recording the daily events of Dorsky and his partner, artist Jerome Hiler, around Lake Owassa in New Jersey and in Manhattan. The two films revolve around the four seasons with Part 1 revolving around spring through summer while part 2 revolves around fall through winter. According to Dorsky, he states that the film "is an arrangement of images, energies, and illuminations from daily life" and a "silent tone poem".

In 2012, Hours for Jerome was included in the annual selection of 25 motion pictures added to the National Film Registry of the Library of Congress being deemed "culturally, historically, or aesthetically significant" and recommended for preservation.

Production

The footage for the film was shot in the late 1960s but Dorsky did not begin editing it until 1980. Although the title refers to the religious Book of Hours which covers prayers for the course of a day. Nonetheless, the images are according to Scott MacDonald intended to act as prayers and "reaccess something of the sacred".  Like most of Dorsky's work, it is intended to be projected at silent film speeds of 17-20 frames per second, rather than the usual 24 fps of sound films. The films are recorded in 16mm and run on 18 fps.

According to Dorsky's blog, the film reels are not available online or digitized because it would've been reproduced and it would ruin the original experience of viewing the film in-person in theaters and the artistic aspects of the director's intention. Currently, no digital copy exists.

Summary
Both films depict the seasonal aspects while including Dorsky and his romantic partner. Together, the two parts cover a year, with part one depicting spring and summer and part two fall and winter.

Critical reception
Critic Matthew Flanagan chose it as one of the ten greatest films ever for the 2012 Sight & Sound poll.

Scott MacDonald praised its depiction of the passing year, calling it "America's most compelling cinematic paean to temperate-zone seasonality".

See also
 List of films preserved in the United States National Film Registry
 2015 New York Film Festival

References

External links
 
 Canyon Cinema Hours For Jerome Part I film reel rental in San Francisco
 Canyon Cinema Hours For Jerome Part II film reel rental in San Francisco 
 Hours For Jerome Part I film reel rental in Paris
 Hours For Jerome Part II film reel rental in Paris

1980s avant-garde and experimental films
1982 films
American LGBT-related films
American silent films
Films directed by Nathaniel Dorsky
Silent films in color
United States National Film Registry films
1980s American films